Mamata Mohanta  is an Indian politician. She is a member of parliament in Rajya Sabha the upper house of Indian Parliament from Odisha as a member of the Biju Janata Dal.
 
She was declared elected unopposed among the four candidates for the four seats from Odisha in 2020 Rajysabha Elections .

About
Mamata Mohanta is a social activist and leader of the Kudmi community in the state of Odisha, India. The Kudmi community is a historically marginalized and oppressed community that primarily relies on agriculture for their livelihood. Mamata Mohanta has been a vocal advocate for the rights of the Kudmi community and has been involved in various movements and protests to demand land rights, better working conditions for farmers, and access to education and healthcare for the community.
She is also the founder of the Kudmi Mahila Sabha, a women's organization that works towards empowering women in the Kudmi community and promoting their rights. Mamata Mohanta has been recognized for her work and has received several awards, including the Odisha Living Legend Award and the International Women's Day Award.
Overall, Mamata Mohanta is a respected figure in the Kudmi community and a prominent voice for social justice and equality in Odisha.

References

Living people
Biju Janata Dal politicians
Year of birth missing (living people)
Rajya Sabha members from Odisha